UFC 142: Aldo vs. Mendes was a mixed martial arts event held by the Ultimate Fighting Championship on January 14, 2012 at the HSBC Arena in Rio de Janeiro, Brazil. It was the first UFC event of the year, and was broadcast live on pay-per-view in North America.

Background
UFC 142 featured preliminary fights live on Sportsnet and FX.

Siyar Bahadurzada was scheduled to face Erick Silva, but pulled out of the bout. Veteran fighter Carlo Prater stepped in as a replacement for Bahadurzada.

Rob Broughton was scheduled to face Ednaldo Oliveira, but pulled out of the bout. Recently resigned heavyweight Gabriel Gonzaga replaced Broughton in the bout.

Paulo Thiago was scheduled to face Mike Pyle, but pulled out of the bout due to an injury. Recently resigned welterweight Ricardo Funch replaced Thiago in the bout.

Stanislav Nedkov was scheduled to take on Fabio Maldonado at this event, but visa problems forced Nedkov to withdraw from the bout. Newcomer Caio Magalhaes stepped in as a replacement for Nedkov in late December. However, Maldonado was injured less than a week before his fight with Magalhaes and the bout was scratched from the card.

At the UFC 142 weigh ins, Anthony Johnson failed to make the middleweight limit. Johnson came in 11 pounds over the 186 lb weight allowance, was fined 20 percent of his earnings and the bout was contested at a catchweight of 197 lb. However, Belfort requested that Johnson not weigh more than 205 lb the day of the fight. The UFC mandated that if Johnson could not make the 205 lb limit, the bout would be cancelled. Johnson officially weighed in at 204.2 lb on fight day, and the bout took place as scheduled.

Results

Bonus awards
Fighters were awarded $65,000 bonuses.	

 Fight of the Night: Edson Barboza vs. Terry Etim
 Submission of the Night: Rousimar Palhares
 Knockout of the Night: Edson Barboza

See also
List of UFC events
2012 in UFC

References

Ultimate Fighting Championship events
2012 in mixed martial arts
Mixed martial arts in Brazil
International sports competitions in Rio de Janeiro (city)
2012 in Brazilian sport
January 2012 sports events in South America